Carolyn Connors (born 1960/1961) is an Australian Paralympic swimmer with a vision impairment. She comes from Newcastle and has been blind since birth. She began competitive swimming at the age of 12. At the 1980 Arnhem Paralympics, where she was the only female Australian swimmer to be selected, she won two silver medals in the Women's 100 m Butterfly A and Women's 100 m Freestyle A events and a bronze medal in the Women's 4x50 m Individual Medley A event. She participated in the 1977 and 1982 FESPIC Games, winning four gold medals in the latter competition, and won 20 swimming gold medals  throughout her career. She also broke a world record in the 100 m butterfly at the National Blind Swimming Championships in 1980. Her first swimming coach was Dennis Day and she was later coached by Eric Arnold.

She completed a year-long course at a teacher's college and was then told that she would not be allowed to do the practical teaching component. After the teaching course she studied at the University of Newcastle, and was named the university's sportsperson of the year in 1981. In 1983, she switched from swimming to athletics to allow herself more time to concentrate on her studies.

References

Female Paralympic swimmers of Australia
Swimmers at the 1980 Summer Paralympics
Medalists at the 1980 Summer Paralympics
Paralympic silver medalists for Australia
Paralympic bronze medalists for Australia
Paralympic medalists in swimming
FESPIC Games competitors
Paralympic swimmers with a vision impairment
Australian female freestyle swimmers
Australian female butterfly swimmers
Australian blind people
Sportswomen from New South Wales
Sportspeople from Newcastle, New South Wales
20th-century Australian women
21st-century Australian women
1960s births
Living people